Sigurd Lunde may refer to:

 Sigurd Lunde (architect) (1874–1936), Norwegian architect
 Sigurd Lunde (bishop) (1916–2006), Norwegian bishop